The VRDE Light Armoured Vehicle (LAWV) is a lightweight four-wheeled all-wheel-drive armored combat vehicles developed by Vehicle Research and Development Establishment (VRDE) for the Indian Army. Based on the Canadian LAV III light-armored vehicle, which in turn is based on the Swiss MOWAG Piranha III 8x8, the Armoured Vehicle is the Indian Army's first indigenous armored vehicle. The production is commencing at Ordnance Factory Medak.

Light Armoured Wheeled Vehicle (LAWV) a technology demonstrator has been developed as Armoured Personnel Carrier for reconnaissance and counter insurgency and riot control Operations.

Specification
 Crew              : 6
 Configuration     : 4 x 4, rear engine
 Engine type       : Four-stroke, water-cooled, turbocharged
 Maximum power     :  @ 2400 rpm
 Maximum torque    : 52.5 kg.m @ 1800 rpm
 Gear-box          : Manual, 5 forward and 1 reverse
 Dimensions (lxbxh): 5830 x2230 x2200 mm
 Wheelbase         : 3210 mm
 FAW/RAW/GVW       : 3500/4200/7700 kg
 Payload           : 1000 kg
 Maximum speed     : 84 km/h
 Ground clearance  : 280 mm
 Protection        : Against 7.62 mm AP
 Fire Power        : 7.62 mm MG
Bulletproof windshield glass for driver and commander

References

Military vehicles of India